Imbler High School is a public high school in Imbler, Oregon, United States.

Academics
In 2008, 97% of the school's seniors received a high school diploma. Of 38 students, 37 graduated and one dropped out.

References

High schools in Union County, Oregon
Public middle schools in Oregon
Public high schools in Oregon